Events in the year 1557 in Norway.

Incumbents
Monarch: Christian III

Events
22 January  – Jon Guttormssøn resign as Bishop of Stavnger.

Arts and literature

Births

Deaths
9 March - Gjeble Pederssøn, bishop (born c. 1490).

See also

References